The Pedlar Wildlife Management Area is located on  east of Blacksville in Monongalia County, West Virginia. The wildlife management area is divided into two parts centered on  Dixon Lake and  Mason Lake, named for nearby Mason–Dixon line.

Pedlar was deeded to the West Virginia Division of Natural Resources by Consol Energy and initially opened in 2004.  Improvements to the lakes and a public shooting range at Mason Lake were completed in 2007.

References

External links
West Virginia DNR District 1 Wildlife Management Areas

Wildlife management areas of West Virginia
Protected areas of Monongalia County, West Virginia